quik is a boot loader designed to start Linux on Apple Macintosh PowerPC systems based on the Old World ROM architecture. It was originally written by Paul Mackerras, and portions of its code were reused in all other Linux boot loaders for PowerPC, including the one known as BootX (not to be confused with the Mac OS X boot loader of the same name), which is dependent on the Mac OS. Quik's loader boots from Open Firmware and bypasses the Mac OS entirely. New World ROM systems use yaboot.

It does not work on systems that do not have Open Firmware; older PowerPC hardware based on the NuBus architecture must boot into the Mac OS first and then use a separate boot loader. Quik is the only method of booting Linux on an Apple Network Server.

iQUIK
iQUIK is a maintained version of the quik bootloader. Whereas the original follows a LILO-like booting model, with the second stage embedded inside an OS partition, iQUIK normally boots using its second stage in the first non-partitionmap partition, i.e. the second partition of the APM-partitioned storage device. This makes for a more robust system, making it more difficult to end up with a completely unbootable system. This also means it's possible to create rescue floppies and install media with iQUIK. Other improvements include -
 Initrd support
 Install to floppy
 Preboot scripts (CHRP script-like support)
 Booting Linux kernels of any size, from 2.2 up (including 3.0 and probably newer)
 Richer UI with more commands to locate and boot kernels
 Better ext2 file system support with symlinks, listing directories
 Better hardware and firmware support, working around OpenFirmware 1.0.5 and 2.0.1 bugs
 Cross-compile support with a recent tool chain and no external library dependencies

External links
quik homepage at penguinppc.org
quik 2.1 (latest known version) at shiner.info   (This site no longer exists)
iquik (an updated version that can boot recent Linux kernels and has better hardware support)

References

Boot loaders